The Beauty of Cadiz (French: La belle de Cadix, Spanish: La bella de Cádiz) is a 1953 French-Spanish musical comedy film directed by Raymond Bernard and Eusebio Fernández Ardavín and starring Luis Mariano, Carmen Sevilla and Jean Tissier. It is an operetta film, based on the 1945 operetta of the same title.

It was shot at the Boulogne Studios in Paris. The film's sets were designed by the art director Léon Barsacq.

Plot 
A French cinema company is shooting a picture requiring real gypsies, so they hire a whole bunch and choose beautiful María Luisa to team with famed singer Carlos Molina. The plot includes a marriage and María Luisa believes it has been a real one.

Cast
 Luis Mariano as Carlos  
 Carmen Sevilla as Maria-Luisa 
 Jean Tissier as Auguste Legrand  
 Claude Nicot as Robert  
 Claire Maurier as Alexandrine Dupont  
 Thérèse Dorny as Blanche  
 J.A. Pierjac as Manillon  
 Léonce Corne as Le photographe  
 José Torres as Raphael  
 André Wasley 
 Pierre Flourens 
 Yvonne Claudie 
 Conchita Bautista
 Fernando Sancho
 Rafael Arcos 
 Rosario Royo
 Christine Bailli 
 Chantal Retz 
 Joëlle Robin 
 Michèle Nancey
 Janine Zorelli

References

External links 
 

1953 films
1953 musical comedy films
French musical comedy films
Spanish musical comedy films
Operetta films
1950s French-language films
1950s Spanish-language films
Films directed by Raymond Bernard
Films set in Andalusia
Films shot at Boulogne Studios
1950s Spanish films
1950s French films